The minute tree-fungus beetles, family Ciidae, are a sizeable group of beetles which inhabit Polyporales bracket fungi or coarse woody debris. Most numerous in warmer regions, they are nonetheless widespread and a considerable number of species occur as far polewards as Scandinavia for example.

Description
As their name implies, minute tree-fungus beetles are tiny, about 0.5 to 5 mm long. Their body is short and cylindrical, often convex, sometimes with a smooth coat of fine short hairs, sometimes being covered in long bristly hairs. They are mostly dark brown or blackish. The short antennae consist of 8–10 segments. The pronotum is wider than long and often forming a quite prominent helmet-like structure. The elytra do not taper noticeably over most of their length. The legs are short, the tibiae of the forelegs often bear characteristic extensions at the ends.

Ecology
These beetles usually inhabit Polyporaceae or more rarely Corticiaceae bracket fungi. The larvae as well as the adults burrow inside the fungi, often choosing old specimens or old tissue. The whole development, from egg to adult, often takes as little as two months; some are parthenogenetic. A few species are pests of commercial fungi, as in the case of Cis chinensis, which infests dried fruiting-bodies of Ganoderma lucidum.

At least one ciid, Falsocis brasiliensis, is a threatened species. It occurs only in small forest remnants of the Northeast and Southeast Regions of Brazil.

Minute tree-fungus beetles are food for many predatory insects, like rove beetles (Staphylinidae), checkered beetles (Cleridae) and parasitoid wasp larvae.

List of genera

 Acanthocis Miyatake, 1954 
 Aliocis Sandoval-Gómez & Lopes-Andrade, 2015
 Apterocis Perkins, 1900
 Atlantocis Israelson, 1985
 Ceracis Mellié, 1849 
 Cis Latreille, 1796 
 Cisarthron Reitter, 1885
 Dichodontocis Kawanabe, 1994
 Dimerapterocis Scott, 1926
 Diphyllocis Reitter, 1885
 Dolichocis Dury, 1919
 Ennearthron Mellié, 1847
 Euxestocis Miyatake, 1954
 Falsocis Pic, 1916
 Grossicis Antunes-Carvalho, Sandoval-Gómez & Lopes-Andrade, 2012
 Hadreule Thomson, 1859
 Hyalocis Kawanabe, 1993
 Lipopterocis Miyatake, 1954
 Malacocis Gorham, 1886 
 Neoapterocis Lopes-Andrade, 2007
 Neoennearthron Miyatake, 1954
 Nipponapterocis Miyatake, 1954
 Nipponocis Nobuchi & Wada, 1955
 Octotemnus Mellié, 1847
 Odontocis Nakane & Nobuchi, 1955
 Orthocis Casey, 1898
 Paratrichapus Scott, 1926
 Paraxestocis Miyatake, 1954
 Phellinocis Lopes-Andrade & Lawrence, 2005 
 Plesiocis Casey, 1898
 Polynesicis Zimmerman, 1938
 Porculus Lawrence, 1987 
 Rhopalodontus Mellié, 1847
 Scolytocis Blair, 1928 
 Sphindocis Fall, 1917
 Strigocis Dury, 1917
 Sulcacis Dury, 1917
 Syncosmetus Sharp, 1891
 Tropicis Scott, 1926 
 Wagaicis Lohse, 1964
 Xylographella Miyatake, 1985
 Xylographus Mellié, 1847

References

This article draws heavily on the corresponding article in the Dano-Norwegian-language Wikipedia.
 Gumier-Costa, F., Lopes-Andrade, C. & Zacaro, A. A. 2003. Association of Ceracis cornifer (Mellié) (Coleoptera: Ciidae) with the bracket fungi Pycnoporus sanguineus (Basidiomycetes: Polyporaceae). Neotropical Entomology, 32(2): 359–360.
 Lawrence, J. F. 1987. A new genus of Ciidae (Coleoptera, Tenebrionoidea) from the Neotropical region. Revista Brasileira de Entomologia, 31(1): 41–47.
 Lawrence, J. F. 1991. Three new Asiatic Ciidae (Coleoptera: Tenebrionoidea) associated with commercial, dried fungi. The Coleopterists Bulletin, 45: 286-292.
 Lawrence, J. F.; Lopes-Andrade, C. 2008. Ciidae Species Listing. Joel Hallan's Biology Catalog, Online 
 Lopes-Andrade, C. 2007a. Neoapterocis, a new genus of apterous Ciidae (Coleoptera: Tenebrionoidea) from Chile and Mexico. Zootaxa, 1481: 35-47.
 Lopes-Andrade, C. 2007b. Notes on Falsocis Pic (Coleoptera: Tenebrionoidea: Ciidae), with the description of an endangered Brazilian species. Zootaxa, 1544: 41-58.
 Lopes-Andrade, C. 2008 The first record of Cis chinensis Lawrence from Brazil, with the delimitation of the Cis multidentatus species-group (Coleoptera: Ciidae). Zootaxa, 1755: 35-46.
 Lopes-Andrade, C., Gumier-Costa, F. & Sperber, C. F. (2003) Why do male Xylographus contractus Mellié (Coleoptera: Ciidae) present abdominal fovea? Evidence of sexual pheromone secretion. Neotropical Entomology, 32: 217-220.
 Lopes-Andrade, C., Gumier-Costa, F., Zacaro, A.A. 2003. Cis leoi, a new species of Ciidae (Coleoptera: Tenebrionoidea) from the Neotropical Region. Zootaxa, 161: 1–7.
 Lopes-Andrade, C., Madureira, M. S., Zacaro, A. A. 2002. Delimitation of the Ceracis singularis group (Coleoptera: Tenebrionoidea: Ciidae), with the description of a new Neotropical species. Dugesiana, 9: 59–63.
 Lopes-Andrade, C., Zacaro, A. A. 2003a. The first record of Ennearthron Mellié, 1848 (Coleoptera: Tenebrionoidea: Ciidae) in the Southern Hemisphere, with the description of a distinctive new species. Zootaxa, 395: 1–7.
 Lopes-Andrade, C., Zacaro, A. A. 2003b. Xylographus lucasi, a new Brazilian species of Ciidae (Coleoptera: Tenebrionoidea). Dugesiana, 10: 1–6.
 Lopes-Andrade, C. & Lawrence, J. F. 2005. Phellinocis, a new genus of Neotropical Ciidae (Coleoptera: Tenebrionoidea). Zootaxa, 1034: 43–60.
 Madenjian, J. J., Eifert, J. D. & Lawrence, J. F. 1993. Ciidae: newly recognized beetle pests of commercial dried mushrooms. Journal of Stored Products Research, 29: 45-48.
 Orledge, G. M., Reynolds, S. E. 2005. Fungivore host-use groups from cluster analysis: patterns of utilisation of fungal fruiting bodies by ciid beetles. Ecological Entomology, 30(6): 620–641.
 Ruta, R. 2003. Rhopalodontus lawrencei n. sp. – the first Rhopalodontus species in the Oriental Region. Genus, 14(3): 363–369.

 
Beetle families